The Kings of Ailech were the over-kings of the medieval Irish province of Ailech in north-western Ireland. It encompassed the territories of the Cenél nEógain and Cenél Conaill. After the battle of Cloítech in 789 its kings were exclusively from the Cenél nEógain. The royal fort for Ailech was the Grianan of Aileach, a hillfort on top of Greenan Mountain in modern-day County Donegal, Republic of Ireland.

Early kings (5th–8th centuries)
Earlier Kings of Cenél nEógain and Ailech included:
 Eógan mac Néill Noigallach (died 465)
 Muiredach mac Eógain (died c. 489) 
 Muirchertach mac Muiredaig (died 534)
 Forggus mac Muirchertaig (died 566) 
 Domnall Ilchelgach mac Muirchertaig (died 566)
 Báetán mac Muirchertaig (died 572)
 Eochaid mac Domnaill (died 572)
 Colcu mac Domnaill (died 580)
 Colmán Rímid mac Báetáin (died 604)
 Áed Uaridnach mac Domnaill (died 612)
 Suibne Menn mac Fiachnai (died 628)
 Máel Fithrich mac Áedo Uaridnach (died 630)
 Ernaine mac Fiachnai (died 636)
 Crundmáel mac Suibni Menn (died c. 660)
 Ferg mac Crundmaíl (died c. 668)
 Máel Dúin mac Máele Fithrich (died 681)
 Fland mac Máele Tuile (died 700)
 Urthuile mac Máele Tuile.

Kings between 700 and 1185
The following is a list of their Kings from 700 to 1197. Some were also High Kings of Ireland.
 Fergal mac Máele Dúin                          700 – 11 December 722
 Áed Allán mac Fergaile                         722–743
 Niall Frossach mac Fergaile                    743–770
 Máel Dúin mac Áedo Alláin                      770–788
 Áed Oirdnide mac Néill                         788–819
 Murchad mac Máele Dúin                         819–823
 Niall Caille mac Áeda                           823–846
 Máel Dúin mac Áeda                             846–867
 Áed Findliath mac Néill                      c. 855 – 20 November 879
 Murchad mac Máele Dúin                         879–887
 Flaithbertach mac Murchado                     887–896
 Domnall mac Áeda                               887–915
 Niall Glúndub mac Áeda                        896 – 15 September 919
 Flaithbertach mac Domnaill                     916–919
 Fergal mac Domnaill                            919–938
 Muirchertach mac Néill                         938 – 26 February 943.
 Domnall mac Muirchertaig ua Néill          943–980
 Flaithbertach mac Muirchertaig meic Néill      943
Ruaidrí ua Canannáin 943-956
 Flaithbertach mac Conchobair                   956–962
 Tadg mac Conchobair                            956–962
 Conn mac Conchobair                            956–962
 Murchad Glun re Lar mac Flaithbertaigh         962–972
 Fergal mac Domnaill meic Conaing               980–989 (still styled as king of Aileach in his obituary in 1000)
 Áed mac Domnaill Ua Néill                      989–1004
 Flaithbertach Ua Néill                     1004–1031
 Áed mac Flaithbertaig Ua Néill                 1031–1033
 Flaithbertach Ua Néill (again)                 1033–1036
 Niall mac Máel Sechnaill                       1036–1061
 Ardgar mac Lochlainn                           1061–1064
 Áed Ua hUalgairg                               1064–1067
 Domnall mac Néill                              1067–1068
 Áed mac Néill                                  1068–1083
 Donnchad mac Néill                             1083–1083
 Domnall Ua Lochlainn                       1083 – 9 February 1121
 Conchobar mac Domnaill                         1121–1128
 Magnus Ua Lochlainn                            1128–1129
 Conchobar mac Domnaill                         1129–1136
 Domhnall Mac Lochlainn                         1136-1136
 Muirchertach Mac Lochlainn                 1136–1143
 Domnall Ua Gairmledaig                         1143–1145
 Muirchertach Mac Lochlainn (again)             1145–1166
 Conchobar mac Muirchertaigh Mac Lochlainn       1166–1167
 Niall Mac Lochlainn                        1167–1176
 Aed In Macaem Toinlesc Ua Neill            1167–1177
 Mael Sechlainn mac Muirchertaigh Mac Lochlainn  1177–1185
 Domhnall Mac Aedh Mac Lochlainn                1185-1186
 Ruaidhri Ua Flaithbheartaigh                   1186-1187
 Domhnall Mac Aedh Mac Lochlainn (again)        1187-1188
 Muirchertach Mac Muirchertaigh Mac Lochlainn   1188-1196
 Flaithbheartach Ua Maol Doraidh                1196-1197

Kings post-1185
From 1185, the Cenél nEógain ruled as Kings of Tír Eógain.

The last to actually be styled King of Ailech was Áed Buide Ua Néill (died 1283).

See also
 List of Irish kings
 Irish royal families

References

"Cenel nEogain Kings of Ailech 700-1185", pages 194–195 in A New History of Ireland, volume IX, ed. Byrne, Martin, Moody, 1984.
 T.M.Charles-Edwards, Early Christian Ireland 
 Francis J.Byrne, Irish Kings and High-Kings

External links
 Grianan of Aileach Visitor Centre

 
Connachta
Ailech
Ailech
Meic Lochlainn
O'Neill dynasty
5th-century establishments in Ireland
1185 disestablishments in Ireland